Besmir Arifaj (born 6 May 1986) is an Albanian professional footballer who plays as a midfielder.

Club career

Bylis Ballsh
On 8 August 2012, Arifaj agreed personal term and signed a two-year contract with Bylis Ballsh. He made his first appearance for the new club on 26 August in the opening Albanian Superliga week against Flamurtari Vlorë, entering as a second-half substitute in a 1–1 draw. During the course of 2012–13 season, Arifaj made 25 appearances, including 18 in league, as Bylis barley assured the survival in Superliga. He also made 9 appearances in cup, as Bylis reached the final for the first time in history, losing out to Laçi after extra time, as Arifaj was sent-off during the match. During this competition, he scored in the 3–1 home win against Luftëtari Gjirokastër. He left the club following the end of the season.

Luftëtari Gjirokastr
In January 2016, Arifaj joined fellow Albanian First Division side Luftëtari Gjirokastër until the end of the season. He made his debut on 13 February in the league encounter against Lushnja, playing for 57 minutes in an eventual 0–1 away win. Arifaj scored his first goal of the campaign on 30 April, netting the lone goal of the match against Sopoti Librazhd. The team finished the Group B in the first position with 68 points, and was promoted to Albanian Superliga for the first time since 2012. Following the end of the season, the club terminated the contract with Arifaj by mutual consent, making him a free agent in the process.

Third spell at Dinamo Tirana
On 29 July 2016, Arifaj returned to Dinamo Tirana for the second time by signing a one-year contract.

Korabi Peshkopi
On 19 January 2017, Arifaj signed a contract until the end of the season with Albanian Superliga  Korabi Peshkopi.

Honours
Dinamo Tirana
Albanian Cup: 2008–09

Luftëtari Gjirokastër
Albanian First Division: 2015–16

References

1986 births
Living people
People from Pukë
Albanian footballers
Association football midfielders
FK Partizani Tirana players
Flamurtari Vlorë players
KS Kastrioti players
FK Tomori Berat players
FK Dinamo Tirana players
KF Bylis Ballsh players
Luftëtari Gjirokastër players
KF Korabi Peshkopi players
Kategoria e Parë players
Kategoria Superiore players